Abdul Qadir is a male Muslim given name.

Abdul Qadir or variants may also refer to:

People
 Abdul Qadir (Muslim leader) (1872–1950), leader of Muslims during the British Raj
 Abdul Quadir (1906–1984), Bangladeshi poet
 Abdul Qadir (Afghan communist) (1944–2014), Afghan military officer during the Saur Revolution and Minister of Defense during the Democratic Republic of Afghanistan (DRA)
 Abdul Kadir (cricketer) (1944–2002), Pakistani cricketer
 Abdul Kadir (Indonesian footballer) (1948–2003)
 Abdul Qadir (Afghan leader) (ca. 1951–2002), military leader of the Northern Alliance in Afghanistan
 Abdul Kadir (politician) (ca. 1952–2018), Guyanese politician and conspirator in a planned attack of JFK Airport
 Abdul Qadir (cricketer) (1955–2019), Pakistani cricketer
 Abdul Cader (cricketer) (born 1995), Sri Lankan cricketer
 Abdul Qadir (banker) (born 1903), Pakistani banker
 Justin Abdelkader (born 1987), American ice hockey player

Places in Algeria
Ouled Ben Abdelkader, a commune in Chlef Province
Ouled Ben Abdelkader District, a district of Chlef Province
El Emir Abdelkader, a municipality 
Emir Abdelkader, Jijel, a town
Bordj Emir Abdelkader, a wilayah of Tissemsilt
Bordj Emir Abdelkader District, a Tissemsilt Province

Other uses
"Abdel Kader" (song), an Algerian song made famous by Khaled
Emir Abdelkader Mosque, a mosque in Constantine
Stade Abdelkader Khalef, a football stadium
Lycée Abdel Kader, a school in Beirut, Lebanon
Ottoman battleship Abdül Kadir
 Berberia abdelkader, a species of butterfly from North Africa

See also
 Main Abdul Qadir Hoon, a Pakistani TV drama serial